Homogeneous broadening is a type of emission spectrum broadening in which all atoms radiating from a specific level under consideration radiate with equal opportunity. If an optical emitter (e.g. an atom) shows homogeneous broadening, its spectral linewidth is its natural linewidth, with a Lorentzian profile.

Broadening in laser systems
Broadening in laser physics is a physical phenomenon that affects the spectroscopic line shape of the laser emission profile. The laser emission is due to the (excitation and subsequent) relaxation of a quantum system (atom, molecule, ion, etc.) between an excited state (higher in energy) and a lower one. These states can be thought of as the eigenstates of the energy operator. The difference in energy between these states is proportional to the frequency/wavelength of the photon emitted. Since this energy difference has a fluctuation, then the frequency/wavelength of the "macroscopic emission" (the beam) will have a certain width (i.e. it will be "broadened" with respect to the "ideal" perfectly monochromatic emission).

Depending on the nature of the fluctuation, there can be two types of broadening. If the fluctuation in the frequency/wavelength is due to a phenomenon that is the same for each quantum emitter, there is homogeneous broadening, while if each quantum emitter has a different type of fluctuation, the broadening is inhomogeneous.

Examples of situations where the fluctuation is the same for each system (homogeneous broadening) are natural or lifetime broadening, and collisional or pressure broadening. In these cases each system is affected "on average" in the same way (e.g. by the collisions due to the pressure).

The most frequent situation in solid state systems where the fluctuation is different for each system (inhomogeneous broadening) is when because of the presence of dopants, the local electric field is different for each emitter, and so the Stark effect changes the energy levels in an inhomogeneous way. The homogeneous broadened emission line will have a Lorentzian profile (i.e. will be best fitted by a Lorentzian function), while the inhomogeneously broadened emission will have a Gaussian profile. One or more phenomena may be present at the same time, but if one has a wider fluctuation, it will be the one responsible for the character of the broadening.

These effects are not limited to laser systems, or even to optical spectroscopy. They are relevant in magnetic resonance as well, where the frequency range is in the radiofrequency region for NMR, and one can also refer to these effects in EPR where the lineshape is observed at fixed (microwave) frequency and in a magnetic field range.

Semiconductors
In a semiconductors, if all oscillations have the same eigenfrequency  and the broadening in the imaginary part of the dielectric function  results only from a finite damping , the system is said to be homogeneously broadened, and  has a Lorentzian profile. If the system contains many oscillators with slightly different frequencies about  however, then the system is inhomogeneously broadened.

See also
 Homogeneity (physics)
 Voigt profile
 Spectral line shape

References

Laser science
Atomic, molecular, and optical physics